Generative Phonology: Description and Theory is a 1979 book by  Michael Kenstowicz and Charles Kisseberth in which the authors provides an introduction to phonology in the framework of generative grammar.

Reception
The book was reviewed by Daniel A. Dinnsen, Georffrey S. Nathan and Margaret W. Epro.

References

External links 
 Generative Phonology: Description and Theory
1979 non-fiction books
Phonology books
Linguistics textbooks
Academic Press books
Generative linguistics